Actinella robusta is a species of air-breathing land snail, a terrestrial pulmonate gastropod mollusc in the family Geometridae. This species is endemic to Portugal.

References

robusta
Taxonomy articles created by Polbot